Veena George (born 3 August 1976) is an Indian politician and former journalist who has served as the Minister for Health and Family Welfare of Kerala since 2021. She represents Aranmula State Assembly Constituency in the Kerala Legislative Assembly since 2016. She is a member of the Communist Party of India (Marxist). Prior to joining politics, she has worked with major Malayalam news channels for over 16 years. She is also the first female executive editor among Malayalam news channels.

Personal life
Born in Thiruvananthapuram on 3 August 1976 to Rosamma Kuriakose and Adv. P. E. Kuriakose, she did her basic schooling from Mount Bethany High School Mylapra in Pathanamthitta district. She pursued Physics for graduation and postgraduation from Government College for Women, Thiruvananthapuram and completed her B.Ed. as a University of Kerala rank holder. She had taught Physics at Catholicate College Pathanamthitta for one year before taking up journalism as her career choice. She joined Kairali TV as a journalist trainee and had a 16 year old successful career with prominent Malayalam news channels. In 2015, she took charge as the executive editor of the Malayalam news channel TV New and become the first woman to do so.
She is married to Dr. George Joseph, a higher secondary school teacher.

Career

Television career

Veena George began her career at Kairali TV as a journalist trainee, later she joined Manorama News as a news anchor and also presented morning shows and special international news programmes. Later she was associated with Malayalam news channels Indiavision, Reporter TV in prominent roles and joined TV New in the role of executive editor in 2015.

Political career

She was a Students' Federation of India (SFI) activist in her college days. She contested elections for the first time when the CPI (M) fielded her from an INC held Aranmula seat in 2016 assembly polls. She defeated senior INC leader, K. Sivadasan Nair with a margin of 7646 votes. In 2019 Indian general election, Veena contested from Pathanamthitta Lok Sabha constituency and came second in a fierce tri-cornered battle with the BJP and INC. She retained her seat in 2021 assembly elections with an increased margin of 19,003 votes. On 20 May 2021, she was sworn in as a cabinet minister in the first Left Democratic Front government to retain power and the first government to be re-elected since 1977. On 21st, she took charge as the Minister of Health and Family Welfare as the successor of renowned CPI (M) leader, K. K. Shailaja.

Election candidature history

Assembly election candidature history

Parliament election candidature history

References

1976 births
Living people
University of Kerala alumni
People from Aranmula
Communist Party of India (Marxist) politicians from Kerala
Kerala MLAs 2016–2021
Journalists from Kerala
Indian Christians
20th-century Indian journalists
Indian women journalists
Indian Marxist journalists
21st-century Indian women writers
21st-century Indian journalists
20th-century Indian women writers
Indian women television journalists
Indian television journalists
Indian women television presenters
Television personalities from Kerala